Matteo Camera (Amalfi, 20 November 1820 – Salerno, 2 December 1891) was an Italian historian and numismatist.

He primarily published works about history of Southern Italy and the town of Amalfi.

Works 
 Annali delle Due Sicilie
 Giovanni I e Carlo III di Durazzo
 Memorie storico diplomatiche di Amalfi
 Istoria della città e costiera di Amalfi

19th-century Italian historians
Italian numismatists
1820 births
1891 deaths
People from Amalfi